Sorol is a coral atoll of nine islands in the central Caroline Islands in the Pacific Ocean, and forms a legislative district in Yap State in the Federated States of Micronesia. Sorol has been uninhabited since the early 1980s. Sorol is a municipality with the state of Yap.

Geography

The northern rim of the atoll consists of a reef with several islets. The shorter southern rim is less well-developed and narrower than the northern rim, with two small passages into the lagoon. Only the four largest islets are vegetated.

Among the individual islets are the following:
Bigelimol (northwesternmost)
Bigeliwol (northwest)
Bigelor (southeasternmost)
Birara (south)
Falewaidid (north)
Sorol (southeast)

History
First recorded sighting of Sorol Island was by the Spanish navigator Alonso de Arellano on 22 January 1565 on board of the patache San Lucas.

As with all of the Caroline Islands, they were sold by Spain to the Empire of Germany in 1899. The island came under the control of the Empire of Japan after World War I, and was subsequently administered under the South Seas Mandate. Following World War II. The island came under the control of the United States of America and was administered as part of the Trust Territory of the Pacific Islands from 1947, and became part of the Federated States of Micronesia from 1979.

References
 Columbia Gazetteer of the World. Vol. 1, p. 900

External links

Islands of Yap
Municipalities of Yap
Atolls of the Federated States of Micronesia